The Francis Bowes Sayre Sr. Highway or simply the Sayre Highway is a four-lane, primary national highway that connects Cagayan de Oro, Misamis Oriental to Kabacan, North Cotabato. It traverses the provinces of Misamis Oriental, Bukidnon and North Cotabato.

The highway's name was Route 3 but was changed to Sayre Highway, in honor of Francis Bowes Sayre, Sr., the U.S. Philippine High Commissioner who spearheaded its construction. This section of the Philippine national highway was constructed during the American occupation of the Philippines.

The parts of the highway are composed of National Route 10 (N10), a spur route of Asian Highway 26 in the north; and National Route 943 (N943) in the southern portion of the Philippine highway network.

Route description

Intersections

References

Roads in Misamis Oriental
Roads in Bukidnon
Roads in Cotabato